South Amherst may refer to:

 South Amherst, Massachusetts, USA
 South Amherst Common Historic District
 South Amherst, Ohio, USA
 South Amherst High School

See also
 Amherst (disambiguation)